Yuri Pavlovich Yukechev (Yuriy Pavlovič Yukečev) (born 1 January 1947) is a Russian composer and music teacher. He is an Honoured Art Worker of the Russian Federation.

Biography
Yuri Yukechev was born in 1947 in Mukachevo, Ukraine. In 1965-1970 he studied composition at the St. Petersburg (Leningrad) Conservatoire with the famous in Russia teacher Orest Yevlakhov (pupil of Dmitri Shostakovich). Since 1970 he has been living and working in Novosibirsk where he is a professor of composition at the Novosibirsk State Conservatoire. Since 1996 he also holds a post of the chairman of Siberian Branch of Russian Composers Union.

Yuri Yukechev is an author of more than 300 works. There are three directions predominate in his music:
 Classical genres of chamber instrumental and choral music
 Improvisation music with a strong influence of free and avant-garde jazz
 Electronic music including audio-visual installations

As a teacher of composition Yuri Yukechev has taught many composers, musicologists, music teachers and other musicians currently working throughout Russia and abroad.

Selected discography
«Siberian 4», Leo Records, UK

«Untitled», Leo Records, UK

«Document (Russia Jazz-80)», Leo Records, UK

«My Heart Is Ready», Hellicon Classics, USA

References

External links
 MySpace page

1947 births
Living people
People from Mukachevo
20th-century classical composers
21st-century classical composers
Musicians from Novosibirsk
Russian male classical composers
Soviet male composers
20th-century Russian male musicians
21st-century Russian male musicians
Academic staff of Novosibirsk Conservatory